Magnolia School District may refer to:
Magnolia School District (Arkansas)
Magnolia School District (California)
Magnolia School District (New Jersey)